The WCT Latvian Mixed Doubles Curling Cup is an annual mixed doubles curling series on the ISS Mixed Doubles World Curling Tour. There are two events held annually, usually held a week apart in April. They take place at the Kērlinga halle in Riga, Latvia. For the 2020–21 curling season, the first event was held in November 2020, while the second event was held in April 2021. For the 2021–22 curling season, the first event was held in November 2021, while the second event was held in April 2022.

The purse for both events is €1,000 and the event categorization for both events is 100 (highest calibre is 1000).

The event has been held since 2016, making it one of the oldest mixed doubles tour events. The event usually attracts some of the top teams in Europe, but due to the COVID-19 pandemic in Latvia, the 2020 event was mostly played by Latvian teams. It has been part of the tour since 2017.

Past champions

References

External links
Official Website

World Curling Tour events
Curling competitions in Latvia
Sports competitions in Riga
Latvia